NE2S is the third studio album by French rapper Nessbeal. It was released on June 14, 2010 by 7th Magnitude, Because Éditions and Sony Music France on iTunes. The album entered the French Albums Charts at number 13, where it had since peaked.

Singles
 "Ça bouge pas" was released as the album's lead single on 31 May 2010, but did not chart.
 "À chaque jour suffit sa peine" was released as the album's second single, also on 31 May 2010. It peaked at number 15 on the Belgian Ultratip 50 Chart in Wallonia.
 "Ma grosse", featuring Orelsan, was released as the album's third single on 14 June 2010, the day of the album's release. However, it did not chart.

Track listing
All songs written by Nabil Sahli (except "NE2S"; written by Youssef Chellak).

Personnel
Credits for NE2S adapted from Discogs.

 2093&2031 – Producer
 Chris Chavenon – Mixing
 EvaanZ – Featured artist
 La Fouine – Featured artist
 Indila – Featured artist, producer
 Isleym – Featured artist
 Bradley Jones – Featured artist
 Cyril Meric – Recording
 Fred N'Landu – Mixing
 Orelsan – Featured artist
 Guen Roulette – Recording
 Skread – Producer, recording
 Street Fabulous – Producer
 Oz Touch – Mixing
 Mister You – Featured artist

Chart performance

References

2010 albums
Nessbeal albums
7th Magnitude albums
Albums produced by Skread